Burning at the Mistake is the second EP of the Australian post-hardcore/metal band The Valley. It debuted at No. 12 on the Australian Independent Charts.

Track listing

"Nonpareil"
"Apparently I'm Walking A Narrow Path"
"If You Woke This Morning"
"You Ain't Got Nothing On Jack Caine"
"These Shadows Aren't Threatening Anymore"
"A Toast, As The Evening Fades"

Notes 

Scott Tarasenko - Vocals
Shaun Pretorious - Guitars + Clean Vocals
Tom Muller - Guitars
James Taylor - Bass
Tim Glastonbury - Drums
Produced by: The Valley
Engineered and mixed by: Pete King
Mastered by: Don Bartley

2006 EPs
The Valley (band) albums